Macrobrochis grahami is a moth of the family Erebidae. It was described by William Schaus in 1924. It is found in Sichuan, China.

References

Lithosiina
Moths described in 1924